Lano & Woodley Sing Songs is the live 2005 album by Australian comedy duo, Lano & Woodley. The album was recorded at a show the pair did in August 2005 at the HiFi Bar in Melbourne, and features many visual jokes that the listener is unable to identify, which was joked at several times during the performance. The album won the 2006 ARIA Award for Best Comedy Release.

Track listing

"Naughty" – 1:44
"Cross the Line" – 1:54
"Words" – 0:21
"Contradict" – 0:13
"Dogman" – 1:19
"Cat Blues" – 5:01
"Twenty Years" 0:31
"Again and Again and Again and Again" – 3:14
"Snake" – 0:16
"Love" – 1:45
"Barry" – 1:18
"College Year Book" – 0:15
"I Saw Macca" – 5:35
"Tattslotto" – 3:03
"Clowns" – 0:36
"Head Over Heels" – 2:38
"Bouncy Rabbit" – 3:12
"Sonya" – 6:27
"15 Billion Years" – 1:29
"Sonya Reprise" – 0:29
"Shoppin' Town" – 3:28
"Spelling Bees" – 0:23
"Little Brother" – 4:22
"Shed" – 5:12

After "Shed" concludes at 3:40, there is 33 seconds of silence, followed by an untitled hidden track starting at 4:13, which concludes at 5:12.

Personnel
 Colin Lane – vocals, snare drum
 Frank Woodley – vocals, acoustic guitar
 Mal Webb – bass guitar, trombone, melodeon, djembe, beatboxing, backing vocals
 Justin Brady – harmonica, mandolin, violin, snare drum, backing vocals

References 

2005 live albums
ARIA Award-winning albums
Lano and Woodley albums